Asmir Džafić (born 11 November 1970) is a Bosnian retired football player.

Playing career

International
Džafić made his debut for Bosnia and Herzegovina in an August 1999 friendly match away against Liechtenstein and has earned a total of 3 caps, scoring no goals. His final international was a March 2000 friendly away against Jordan.

Managerial career
He was appointed manager of his former club Velež Mostar in April 2012, after a successful stint as coach of Neretvanac Opuzen. He was dismissed in September 2012. In summer 2017, he was named assistant to manager Admir Adžem at Željezničar.

References

External links

1970 births
Living people
Sportspeople from Mostar
Association football forwards
Bosnia and Herzegovina footballers
Bosnia and Herzegovina international footballers
NK Zagreb players
HNK Suhopolje players
FK Velež Mostar players
Fortuna Düsseldorf players
NK Troglav 1918 Livno players
Croatian Football League players
Premier League of Bosnia and Herzegovina players
Regionalliga players
First League of the Federation of Bosnia and Herzegovina players
Bosnia and Herzegovina expatriate footballers
Expatriate footballers in Croatia
Bosnia and Herzegovina expatriate sportspeople in Croatia
Expatriate footballers in Germany
Bosnia and Herzegovina expatriate sportspeople in Germany
Bosnia and Herzegovina football managers
FK Velež Mostar managers
Premier League of Bosnia and Herzegovina managers
Bosnia and Herzegovina expatriate football managers
Expatriate football managers in Croatia